CDC42 effector protein 5 is a protein that in humans is encoded by the CDC42EP5 gene.

Function

Cell division control protein 42 (CDC42), a small Rho GTPase, regulates the formation of F-actin-containing structures through its interaction with the downstream effector proteins. The protein encoded by this gene is a member of the Borg (binder of Rho GTPases) family of CDC42 effector proteins. Borg family proteins contain a CRIB (Cdc42/Rac interactive-binding) domain. They bind to CDC42 and regulate its function negatively. The encoded protein may inhibit c-Jun N-terminal kinase (JNK) independently of CDC42 binding. The protein may also play a role in septin organization and inducing pseudopodia formation in fibroblasts [provided by RefSeq, Jul 2013].

References